Royal Heights is a suburb in West Auckland, under the local governance of Auckland Council. Moire Park is a large park in Royal Heights, which has both sports grounds and areas of bush with walking tracks. The Manutewhau Walkway in Moire Park follows the Manutewhau Stream.

Demographics

Royal Heights had a population of 7,278 at the 2018 New Zealand census, an increase of 510 people (7.5%) since the 2013 census, and an increase of 813 people (12.6%) since the 2006 census. There were 2,160 households, comprising 3,597 males and 3,678 females, giving a sex ratio of 0.98 males per female, with 1,635 people (22.5%) aged under 15 years, 1,734 (23.8%) aged 15 to 29, 3,168 (43.5%) aged 30 to 64, and 738 (10.1%) aged 65 or older.

Ethnicities were 54.1% European/Pākehā, 17.5% Māori, 21.8% Pacific peoples, 21.2% Asian, and 4.5% other ethnicities. People may identify with more than one ethnicity.

The percentage of people born overseas was 34.5, compared with 27.1% nationally.

Although some people chose not to answer the census's question about religious affiliation, 43.0% had no religion, 41.1% were Christian, 1.1% had Māori religious beliefs, 2.4% were Hindu, 3.0% were Muslim, 1.4% were Buddhist and 1.6% had other religions.

Of those at least 15 years old, 1,140 (20.2%) people had a bachelor's or higher degree, and 939 (16.6%) people had no formal qualifications. 846 people (15.0%) earned over $70,000 compared to 17.2% nationally. The employment status of those at least 15 was that 3,009 (53.3%) people were employed full-time, 714 (12.7%) were part-time, and 288 (5.1%) were unemployed.

Education
Colwill School is a coeducational full primary school (years 1–8), with a roll of  students as of

Gallery

Notes

Suburbs of Auckland
Populated places around the Waitematā Harbour
Henderson-Massey Local Board Area
West Auckland, New Zealand